Bringing Up Bates (stylized as Br1n9ing Up Bates) is an American reality television show on Up TV. It is centered around Gil and Kelly Bates, their 19 children, and extended family.

On January 18, 2022, Up TV announced the show's cancellation after 10 seasons, with the network stating that they are shifting their focus onto new movies and scripted shows for 2022. The family and film crew had already filmed episodes for season 11 which will not air due to its cancellation.

Background
The Bates family was previously featured on a 2012 TV series called United Bates of America on TLC, and it was later announced in October 2014 that the family would return in a new series which would be called Bringing Up Bates on Up TV. The series debuted on January 1, 2015.

The show follows the daily lives of Gil and Kelly Jo Bates, not far from Knoxville, Tennessee and their large family of eighteen children. Another child was born in 2012, bringing the number to 19 children.

The high number of children is partly related to their Fundamental Baptist beliefs that prohibit contraception.

Cast 

 William Gilvin "Gil" Bates
 Kelly Jo Bates

Episodes

Series overview

Specials

Season 1 (2015)

Season 2 (2015)

Season 3 (2016)

Season 4 (2016)

Season 5 (2017)

Season 6 (2017)

Season 7 (2018)

Season 8 (2019)

Season 9 (2020)

Season 10 (2021)

References

External links 
 
 

2010s American reality television series
2015 American television series debuts
Baptist drama television series
English-language television shows
Television shows filmed in Tennessee